Nannopetersius is a genus of African tetras that occurs in Middle Africa.  There are currently two described species.

Species
 Nannopetersius ansorgii	(Boulenger, 1910)
 Nannopetersius lamberti Poll, 1967
 Nannopetersius mutambuei Lunkayilakio & Vreven, 2008

References
 

Alestidae

Taxa named by Jacobus Johannes Hoedeman